Louise Hume Creighton (née von Glehn; 7 July 1850 – 15 April 1936) was a British author of books on historical and sociopolitical topics, and an activist for a greater representation of women in society,  including women's suffrage, and in the Church of England.

Early life
She was born as Louise Hume von Glehn at Peak Hill Lodge in Sydenham, Kent on 7 July 1850. She was one of the younger daughters of Robert von Glehn, a City of London merchant, and his wife, Agnes Duncan. Her older brother was Alfred de Glehn, the designer of the French steam locomotive engine. She was homeschooled before she passed, with honours, the General Examination for Women, the first London University higher examination for women. She was a  prolific reader and a keen student of both the writings of John Ruskin and the Whigs historian John Richard Green.

Marriage to Mandell Creighton
In 1872, Louise married Mandell Creighton, a University of Oxford-educated historian who later became a University of Cambridge Professor in ecclesiastical history, and was appointed Church of England bishop of Peterborough, in 1891, and London, in 1897. The couple had seven children: Beatrice in 1872, Lucia in 1874, Cuthbert in 1876, Walter in 1878, Mary in 1880, Oswin in 1883; and  Gemma in 1887.
Creighton, Mary Augusta Ward  and Charlotte Byron Green were among the "don's wives" who organised lectures for women in Oxford from 1873 and joined the Association for Promoting the Education of Women in Oxford five years later.

Women's rights advocacy
In 1885, Creighton founded the National Union of Women Workers with Lady Laura Ridding and Emily Janes. Although it was called a union, its purpose was to co-ordinate the voluntary efforts of women across Great Britain. Its purpose was to "promote sympathy of thought and purpose among the women of Great Britain and Ireland" Creighton was its first president.

In 1890 Creighton and Kathleen Lyttelton founded the Ladies Dining Society. Many of its members were associated with Newnham College, one of the first Cambridge colleges offering University level education to women. Members included the college's principal Eleanor Sidgwick, the economist Mary Paley Marshall, the classicist Margaret Verrall, Newnham lecturers Mary Jane Ward and Ellen Wordsworth Darwin, the mental health campaigner Ida Darwin, Baroness Eliza von Hügel and the US socialites Caroline Jebb and Maud Darwin. After Creighton moved away she still invited the group to visit her in Peterborough and Fulham. The society met in Cambridge until the First World War.

Creighton was a popular author, particularly of historical biographies and stories for children including the successful "Child's First History of England".

Later career
After the death of her husband in 1901, Creighton  became an influential advocate for women's suffrage and social reform.  As well as writing and editing books, she served on two Royal Commissions and the Joint Committee of Insurance Commissioners.

As a member of the Standing Committee of the Society for the Propagation of the Gospel, she helped promote the work of women missionaries and took a leading role chairing the women's meetings at the Pan-Anglican Congress of 1908.

After nearly twenty years living in a grace-and-favour apartment at Hampton Court Palace, Creighton moved back to Oxford in the late 1920s, and subsequently served on the governing board of Lady Margaret Hall. After a period of declining health, she died on 15 April 1936, and her cremated remains were buried in St Paul's Cathedral, London in the grave of her husband.

See also
Merton College, Oxford
Sydenham

Notes

References

External links
 
 
 

1850 births
1936 deaths
Alumni of University of London Worldwide
Alumni of the University of London
Burials at St Paul's Cathedral
English women writers
British women's rights activists
Presidents of the National Council of Women of Great Britain